Dean Bauck (born 15 May 1954) is a Canadian former athlete who specialised in high jump. He twice qualified for the Summer Olympics, but missed out on competing both times, due to a knee injury in 1976 and the boycott in 1980.

An athlete from Delta, British Columbia, Bauck was a bronze medalist for Canada in high jump at the 1978 Commonwealth Games. His jump of 2.15m gave him a joint third-place finish with Scotland's Brian Burgess and he was one of three Canadians on the podium, with Claude Ferragne and Greg Joy getting gold and silver respectively.

Bauck had a fifth-placed finish at the 1979 Pan American Games.

In 1981 he earned a gold medal at the Pacific Conference Games in Christchurch after a personal best 2.21m jump.

References

External links
Dean Bauck at World Athletics

1954 births
Living people
Canadian male high jumpers
Commonwealth Games bronze medallists for Canada
Commonwealth Games medallists in athletics
Athletes (track and field) at the 1978 Commonwealth Games
People from Delta, British Columbia
Athletes (track and field) at the 1979 Pan American Games
Pan American Games competitors for Canada
Sportspeople from British Columbia
20th-century Canadian people
21st-century Canadian people
Medallists at the 1978 Commonwealth Games